West Bay Centre is a small community on the Western coast of Newfoundland. The population is about 300.

Populated places in Newfoundland and Labrador